Stadionul Ladislau Bölöni is a multi-purpose stadium in Târgu Mureș, Romania.

The ground currently is in a very bad shape of disrepair.  It is used mostly for training and was the home ground of ASA Târgu Mureș.  It had a capacity of 15,000 people. It is named after Ladislau Bölöni.

External links
 Stadium images

Football venues in Romania
Buildings and structures in Târgu Mureș
Multi-purpose stadiums in Romania